Grey gum is a common name for several similar types of Eucalyptus trees.

The large-fruited grey gums are four related species found in eastern Australia:
Eucalyptus punctata of the Sydney Basin is the best known
E. longirostrata from eastern Queensland 
E. biturbinata from the New England region
E. canaliculata from the vicinity of Gloucester and Dungog in central-northern New South Wales.

The small-fruited grey gums are:
Eucalyptus propinqua of the New South Wales central coast
Eucalyptus major of southeastern Queensland

References

Eucalyptus